Ministry of Employment may refer to:
 the Ministry of Labour, Employment and Social Security (Argentina)
Human Resources Development Canada, Canada
 Ministre d’Emploi Quebec, Canada
 the Ministry of Work, Employment, and Social Security (Bolivia)
 the Ministry of Labor and Employment (Brazil)
 the Ministry of Social Affairs and Employment (France)
 the Ministry of Labour and Employment (India)
 the Ministry of Labor and Promotion of Employment (Peru)
 the Department of Labor and Employment (Philippines)
 the Swedish Ministry of Employment

See also
 Ministry of Labor